Vitaliy Sidorov may refer to:

Vitaliy Sidorov (discus thrower) (born 1970), Ukrainian-Russian discus thrower
Vitaliy Sidorov (footballer) (born 1990), Russian footballer